Ibrahim Saeed Al-Rumaihi  is a Qatari football defender who played for Qatar in the 1984 Asian Cup.

References

External links
Ibrahim Al-Rumaihi stats at RSSSF

Qatari footballers
Qatar international footballers
1984 AFC Asian Cup players
Qatar SC players
Qatar Stars League players
Living people
Association football defenders
Year of birth missing (living people)